The Victory Ride Stakes is a Grade III American Thoroughbred horse race for three-year-old fillies run at a distance of  furlongs on the dirt held annually in late June or early July at Belmont Park in Elmont, New York.

History 

The race is named in honor of Victory Ride, winner of the Grade I Test Stakes in 2001.

The event was inaugurated on 23 August 2003 and was held at Saratoga Race Course in Saratoga Springs, New York over a distance of six furlongs. The event was won by the D. Wayne Lukas trained Country Romance in a time of 1:09.62.

The race was ungraded for its first three editions and was upgraded to Grade III in 2006.

Since 2012, the event has been run at Belmont Park in early July. The race was run at 6 furlongs until 2013, when it was increased to  furlongs.

Records
Speed  record:
  furlongs:  1:14.47 –  Frank's Rockette   (2020) 
 6 furlongs: 1:08.89  –  Emma's Encore   (2012)

Margins:
  lengths –  La Traviata (2007)

Most wins by a jockey:
 2 – Joel Rosario (2013, 2014)
 2 – Javier Castellano (2015, 2019)
 2 – Flavien Prat (2017, 2021)

Most wins by a trainer:
 No trainer has won this race more than once.

Most wins by an owner:
 No owner has won this race more than once.

Winners

See also
 List of American and Canadian Graded races

References

Graded stakes races in the United States
Grade 3 stakes races in the United States
Flat horse races for three-year-old fillies
Horse races in New York (state)
Belmont Park
Recurring sporting events established in 2003
2003 establishments in New York (state)